Herpes simplex research includes all medical research that attempts to prevent, treat, or cure herpes, as well as fundamental research about the nature of herpes. Examples of particular herpes research include drug development, vaccines and genome editing. HSV-1 and HSV-2 are commonly thought of as oral and genital herpes respectively, but other members in the herpes family include chickenpox (varicella/zoster), cytomegalovirus, and Epstein-Barr virus. There are many more virus members that infect animals other than humans, some of which cause disease in companion animals (cats, dogs, horses) or have economic impacts in the agriculture industry (e.g., pigs, cows, sheep, chicken, oysters).

Vaccine research 
Various vaccine candidates have been developed, the first ones in the 1920s, but none has been successful to date.

Due to the genetic similarity of both herpes simplex virus types (HSV-1 and HSV-2), the development of a prophylactic-therapeutic vaccine that proves effective against one type of the virus would likely prove effective for the other virus type, or at least provide most of the necessary fundamentals. , several vaccine candidates are in different stages of clinical trials, see list below.

An ideal herpes vaccine should induce immune responses adequate to prevent infection. Short of this ideal, a candidate vaccine might be considered successful if it (a) mitigates primary clinical episodes, (b) prevents colonization of the ganglia, (c) helps reduce the frequency or severity of recurrences, and (d) reduces viral shedding in actively infected or asymptomatic individuals. The fact that a live-attenuated vaccine induced better protection from HSV infection and symptoms is not new, because live-attenuated vaccines account for most of the successful vaccines in use today. However, governmental and corporate bodies seem to support the more recent and safer but possibly less effective approaches such as glycoprotein- and DNA-based vaccines.

Advocacy 
Due to the current stigma of the Herpes Simplex Virus, the topic of a cure has always been considered a "taboo" whilst some also consider the symptoms to be mild that a cure or a vaccine is not needed. However, in April 2020, a Subreddit group was formed to advocate for cure research and better treatment of HSV. The "Herpes Cure Research" has grown to 20k members and has raised funds for Fred Hutch's genome editing treatment and UPenn's mRNA vaccine research as well as forming a Herpes Cure Advocacy group in which the group is raising awareness on the health complications associated with HSV.

Vaccine design 
Vaccine-elicited protection against HSV is challenging to achieve due to the ability of herpesviruses to evade many aspects of the mammalian immune response. As a general principle, the effectiveness of a HSV vaccine design is often inversely proportional to its safety. Subunit vaccines, which consist of individual or small groups of viral antigens, remove all risk of complications resulting from the production of vaccine-associated infectious viral particles but are limited in the degree and scope of immunity that can be produced in vaccinated individuals. Inactivated vaccines, which consist of intact viral particles, dramatically increase the repertoire of viral antigens that engender the immune response but like subunit vaccines are generally constrained to producing humoral immunity. Like inactivated vaccines, replication-defective vaccines expose the immune system to a diverse swath of HSV antigens but can produce both cellular and humoral immunity because they retain the ability to enter cells by HSV-induced membrane fusion. However, replication-defective HSV vaccines are challenging to produce at scale and offer limited immunization due to the lack of vaccine amplification. Live-attenuated vaccines are highly efficacious, potentially eliciting both cell-mediated and humoral immunity against structural and non-structural viral proteins, but their ability to replicate can result in vaccine-related illness particularly in immunocompromised individuals. Whereas subunit vaccines have proven effective against some viruses, immunity produced by subunit HSV vaccines (e.g. Herpevac) have failed to protect humans from acquiring genital herpes in several clinical trials. In contrast, the success of the live-attenuated chickenpox vaccine demonstrates that an appropriately live-attenuated α-herpesvirus may be used to safely control human disease. The challenge of achieving vaccines that are both safe and effective has led to two opposing approaches in HSV vaccine development: increasing the efficacy of subunit vaccines (primarily by improving adjuvant formulations), and increasing the safety of live-attenuated vaccines (including the development of "non-invasive" vaccines).

Vaccine candidates 

The chart below is an attempt to list all known proposed HSV and varicella zoster vaccines and their characteristics. Please update with any missing information on vaccines only.

Live-attenuated non-invasive vaccines 
A recent development in live-attenuated HSV vaccine design is the production of replicative vaccines that are ablated for nervous system infection. These vaccines infect the respiratory mucosa where their replication and localized spread provoke a robust immune response. The safety of these vaccines is based on their inability to invade the nervous system and establish life-long latent infections, as opposed to a general attenuation. Unlike other live-attenuated designs, these vaccines are cleared from the body once the immune response from vaccination has matured. In principle, by avoiding attenuation of HSV replication in the mucosa while removing the capacity to infect the nervous system, non-invasive vaccines have the potential to break the safety-efficacy dilemma by producing the strongest possible immune response while maintaining a high degree of safety.

The VC2 non-invasive vaccine was developed by Dr. Gus Kousoulas at Louisiana State University. VC2 encodes two attenuating mutations that together reduce HSV entry into neurons. The establishment of latency is prevented in animal models such as mice, guinea pig, and rhesus monkeys.

The R2 non-invasive vaccine was developed by Drs. Gregory Smith (Northwestern University Feinberg School of Medicine), Patricia Sollars & Gary Pickard (University of Nebraska-Lincoln), and Ekaterina Heldwein (Tufts University School of Medicine). R2 vaccines retain native replication in epithelial cells but are incapable of retrograde axonal transport and invasion of the nervous system. A single dose of the R2 vaccine passively introduced on mucosal tissues protects the nervous system from future infections and affords protection against lethal encephalitic infections in mice and rats. This vaccine strategy is noted for its effectiveness against both veterinary and clinical neuroinvasive herpesviruses. Thyreos Inc was founded to develop a herpesvirus vaccine platform based on the R2 design with targeted applications in human health, companion animal health, and livestock productivity.

Live-attenuated HSV-2 vaccine 
Dr. William Halford at the Southern Illinois University (SIU) School of Medicine tested a live-attenuated HSV-2 ICP0∆NLS vaccine in 2016, before his death in June, 2017. Vaccine attenuation is achieved by a mutation in ICP0 (ICP0∆NLS) that increases the vaccine strain's sensitivity to interferon responses and limits its replication. Already proven as safe and effective in rodents and eliciting 10 to 100 times greater protection against genital herpes than a glycoprotein D subunit vaccine, Halford's vaccine was tested outside of the United States, in St. Kitts in 20 human volunteers. All 20 of the participants self-reported an improvement in symptoms, but only 17 received and completed all three dosages.  Blot tests showed a clear antibody response, which cannot be instigated by a placebo effect. However, the human trial was conducted without approval from the FDA or from the SIU Institutional Review Board.

Replication-defective HSV-2 vaccine 

David M. Knipe, a professor at Harvard Medical School has developed dl5-29. The dl5-29 vaccine is also known under the name ACAM-529 or HSV-529, a replication-defective vaccine that has proved successful in preventing both HSV-2 and HSV-1 infections and in combating the virus in already-infected hosts, in animal models. The HSV-529 is a leading vaccine candidate which has been investigated in numerous research publications, and is endorsed by many researchers in the field (i.a. Lynda A. Morrison and Jeffrey Cohen).  The vaccine induces strong HSV-2-specific antibody and T-cell responses, protects against challenge with a wild-type HSV-2 virus, reduces the severity of recurrent disease, and provides cross-protection against HSV-1. The ongoing trials would prove if a durable immune response in humans is to be successfully achieved or if the vaccine is too over attenuated to do the same. The vaccine was being researched and developed by Sanofi Pasteur.

On 28 April 2022, Sanofi announced it had discontinued a trial evaluating four HSV-2 vaccines. The pipeline section of the Sanofi website no longer lists any HSV vaccine candidate in active development.

DNA-based vaccine 
Professor Ian Frazer developed an experimental vaccine with his team at Coridon, a biotechnology company he founded in 2000. The company, now known under the name Admedus Vaccines, is researching DNA technology for vaccines with prophylactic and therapeutic potential. What's different about this vaccine is the way that response is being created. Instead of introducing a weakened version of the herpes virus or protein subunit, this vaccine uses a small section of DNA to produce T-cells and stimulate the immune response. The new vaccine candidate is designed to prevent new infections, and to treat those who already have the infection. In February 2014, it was announced that Frazer's vaccine against genital herpes passed human safety trials in a trial of 20 Australians. In October 2014, Admedus announced success in creating a positive T-cell response in 95% of participants. Further research is required to determine if the vaccine can prevent transmission. In July 2014, Admedus increased its stake in Frazer's vaccines by 16.2%. In addition, $18.4 million was posted as funds raised towards Phase II vaccine testing and research.

The HSV-2 Phase II trial began in April 2015.  Interim results were published on March 4, 2016, and based on the results of a scheduled, blinded, pooled analysis of data from the first 20 patients to receive at least three vaccinations in the randomised, placebo controlled Phase II study with the following results:
 No safety issues have been noted in this cohort of patients. The data remains blinded to protect the integrity of the trial.
 Study participants had a marked decrease in viral lesions (outbreaks) with a drop of over 90% in the monthly rate versus baseline.
 The average number of days HSV-2 was detected in patients was reduced versus baseline.
On 19 October 2016, Admedus released interim results from the ongoing HSV-2 Phase IIa study.  The unblinded data demonstrated a 58% reduction in viral shedding compared to baseline and a reduction in outbreaks of 52% post vaccination and 81% overall reduction post-booster.

On 1 June 2020, Admedus announced it had changed its name to Anteris Technologies Ltd., and would become a "dedicated structural heart company". No vaccines are listed in the company's most recent research report and the vaccine is likely discontinued.

Other vaccine exploration 
Vitaherpavac - In patients with monotonously recurrent genital herpes infection and history of failure of standard vaccination, anti-relapse efficacy of Vitaherpavac vaccine was demonstrated after allergometry-based tailored choice of vaccine administration regimen. The used approach was associated with lower antigenic load and sensitization, more than three-fold increase in relapse-free period in 85% of treated patients and improvement of Th1-dependent immunity. The Russian vaccine Vitagerpavak — the only polyvalent vaccine in the world for treatment of the chronic gerpesvirusny infection (CGI) І and ІІ types. It is developed in scientific research institute of virology of D.I. Ivanovsky of the Russian Academy of Medical Science. More than 15 years are applied in the Russian Federation.

A study from the Albert Einstein College of Medicine, where glycoprotein D (gD-2) was deleted from the herpes cell, showed positive results when tested in mice. Researchers deleted gD-2 from the herpes virus, which is responsible for herpes microbes entering in and out of cells. The vaccine is still in early stages of development and more research needs to be conducted before receiving FDA approval for clinical trials.

Research conducted by the NanoBio Corporation indicates that an enhanced protection from HSV-2 is a result of mucosal immunity which can be elicited by their intranasal nanoemulsion vaccine. NanoBio published results showing efficiency in studies conducted in both the prophylactic and the therapeutic guinea pig model. This included preventing infection and viral latency in 92% of animals vaccinated and a reduction in recurrent legions by 64% and viral shedding by 53%. NanoBio hopes to raise funds in 2016 to enter into Phase I clinical testing.

Profectus BioSciences intends to use its PBS Vax therapeutic vaccine technology to engineer a vaccine for HSV-2. The vaccine is in early development and much is unknown about its viability.

Biomedical Research Models, a Worcester-based biopharmaceutical company has been awarded a fund for the development of a novel vaccine platform to combat mucosally transmitted pathogens such as HSV-2.

The company Tomegavax (recently acquired by Vir Biotechnology) is researching to utilize cytomegalovirus vectors in the development of a therapeutic vaccine against herpes simplex virus 2 (HSV-2), the causative agent of genital herpes. It has been awarded a grant by the NIH for this purpose.

Redbiotec, a privately held Swiss biopharmaceutical company, based in Zurich as a spin-off of the ETH Zurich, is focusing on the development of a therapeutic vaccine against HSV-2. Redbiotec's preclinical vaccine shows over 90% of lesion score (vs. approx. 50% for GEN-003 of Genocea) in early findings.

Sanofi Pasteur and the clinical-stage immunotherapy company Immune Design have entered a broad collaboration, which will explore the potential of various combinations of agents against HSV-2, including an adjuvanted trivalent vaccine candidate G103, consisting of recombinantly-expressed viral proteins.

Discontinued vaccines 

Below is a list of vaccines that are no longer being pursued.

Detailed Information on discontinued vaccines 

One vaccine that was under trial was Herpevac, a vaccine against HSV-2. The National Institutes of Health (NIH) in the United States conducted phase III trials of Herpevac.  In 2010, it was reported that, after 8 years of study in more than 8,000 women in the United States and Canada, there was no sign of positive results against the sexually transmitted disease caused by HSV-2 (and this despite earlier favorable interim reports).

PaxVax, a specialty vaccine company, partnered with Spector Lab at the UC San Diego Department of Cellular and Molecular Medicine regarding the development of a genital herpes viral vector vaccine. The vaccine was in the pre-clinical stage. The vaccine is no longer listed on their website as a present endeavour and has likely been discontinued.

A private company called BioVex began Phase I clinical trials for ImmunoVEX, another proposed vaccine, in March 2010. The company had commenced clinical testing in the UK with its vaccine candidate for the prevention and potentially the treatment of genital herpes. The biopharmaceutical company Amgen bought BioVex and their proposed ImmunoVEX vaccine appears to have been discontinued, furthermore it has been removed from the company's research pipeline.

A live, attenuated vaccine (which was proven very effective in clinical trials in Mexico) by the company AuRx has failed to proceed to a Phase III trial in the year 2006, due to financial reasons. The AuRx therapy was shown to be safe and decrease the occurrence of lesions by 86% after one year.

Mymetics is developing a pre-clinical preventative vaccine for HSV 1 and 2 using its virosome technology. There has not been any recent announcement by the company regarding their vaccine, which seems to have been taken off from the company's research product pipeline.

HerpV, a genital herpes vaccine candidate manufactured by the company Agenus, announced Phase II clinical trial results in June 2014. Results showed up to a 75% reduction in viral load and a weak reduction in viral shedding by 14%. These results were achieved after a series of vaccinations and a booster dose after six months, signalling the vaccine may take time to become effective. Further testing results are to show if the vaccine is a viable candidate against genital herpes. There has not been any recent announcement by Agenus regarding the vaccine HerpV, which seems to have been taken off from the company's research product pipeline.

Genocea Biosciences has developed GEN-003, a first-in-class protein subunit T cell-enabled therapeutic vaccine, or immunotherapy, designed to reduce the duration and severity of clinical symptoms associated with moderate-to-severe HSV-2, and to control transmission of the infection. GEN-003 includes the antigens ICP4 and gD2, as well as the proprietary adjuvant Matrix-M. GEN-003 had concluded Phase IIa clinical trials. In December 2015, Genocea announced interim data showing a 58% decrease in viral shedding and a 69% decrease in genital lesions. They also showed one of the doses stopped outbreaks for at least 6 months. GEN-003 was undergoing a Phase IIb clinical trial in the United States. Genocea has announced it would shift their strategic efforts to cancer vaccines while at the same time heavily cutting down on research and development of GEN-003 vaccine against genital herpes. Being unable to secure funding or partnering with another company, Genocea's further vaccine development remains to be determined.

Vical had been awarded grant funding from the National Institute of Allergy and Infectious Diseases division of the NIH to develop a  plasmid DNA-based vaccine to inhibit recurring lesions in patients latently infected with herpes simplex virus type 2 (HSV-2). The plasmid DNA encoding the HSV-2 antigens was formulated with Vaxfectin, Vical's proprietary cationic lipid adjuvant. Vical is concluding Phase I clinical trials, while reporting data showing the vaccine candidate failed to meet the primary endpoint. The San Diego-based company was forced to concede that their herpes strategy had misfired, with their vaccine failing to perform as well as a placebo.  However, that seemed to may have changed, since 20 June 2016, when Vical released phase I/II results at ASM. Their vaccine (named VCL-HB01) was involved in a Phase II clinical trial. The recent trial, similarly to a past trial again missed the primary endpoint and therefore the company is discontinuing the vaccine and moving to other pipeline products.

Genome editing

Another area of research for HSV treatment or a potential cure is the use of genome editing. It is thought that by cleaving the DNA of HSV that infects neurons, thereby causing destruction or mutational inactivation of the HSV DNA, the virus can be greatly treated or even cured.

Notable research

The Jerome Lab run by Keith R. Jerome at the Fred Hutchinson Cancer Research Center has looked at using zinc finger nuclease as well as endonuclease to prevent HSV from replicating. Most recently Jerome and his lab were able to demonstrate cleavage of latent HSV in a living organism, which is vital to disabling the virus. On August 18, 2020, the team led by Jerome and Martine Aubert published a paper in Nature Communications showing that, through a series of incremental improvements on their original method, they had destroyed up to 95% of herpes virus lurking in certain nerve clusters of mice, with 3 years of work expected before clinical trials are considered.

Editas Medicine, that previously collaborated with the Cullen Lab, are researching CRISPR-Cas9 for its use in Herpes Simplex Keratitis.

Researchers at Temple University have been researching how to disrupt HSV from replicating that could eventually lead to a cure. Some members of research team at Temple University have also joined forces to create Excision BioTherapeutics. The company intends to begin clinical trials in 2022.

Researchers at the University Medical Center Utrecht, using the CRISPR-Cas9 system, have showed promising results in clearing HSV-1 infection by simultaneously targeting multiple essential vital genes in vitro. The researchers are now looking at targeting latent HSV-1 genomes and are investigating in vivo model systems to assess the potential therapeutic application.

In 2021, scientists in China described a CRISPR-Cas9 genome editing approach which could be used to treat HSV-1 in corneal stroma: injection of engineered lentiviruses into the affected anatomical regions for transient editing without inducing off-target edits.

Herpes simplex pharmaceutical drugs

A research paper providing an overview of the relatively recent state of research can be found on this page.

Pharmaceutical drugs 

Docosanol is a topical cream approved by the FDA for reducing the outbreak time for oral blisters.

Since the introduction of the nucleoside analogs decades ago, treatment of herpes simplex virus (HSV) infections has not seen much innovation, except for the development of their respective prodrugs (Aciclovir, Famciclovir, Valacilovir..). Drawbacks such as poor bioavailability or limited effectiveness of these drugs require further research effort of new pharmaceutical drugs against the herpes simplex disease. The inhibitors of the Helicase-primase complex of HSV represent a very innovative approach to the treatment of herpesvirus disease.

Notable progress 

Researchers have made a Hammerhead ribozyme that targets and cleaves the mRNA of essential genes in HSV-1. The hammerhead, which targets the mRNA of the UL20 gene, greatly reduced the level of HSV-1 ocular infection in rabbits, and reduced the viral yield in vivo. The gene-targeting approach uses a specially designed RNA enzyme to inhibit strains of the herpes simplex virus. The enzyme disables a gene responsible for producing a protein involved in the maturation and release of viral particles in an infected cell. The technique appears to be effective in experiments with mice and rabbits, but further research is required before it can be attempted in people infected with herpes.

In 2016, researchers showed that the genome editing technology known as CRISPR/Cas can be used to limit viral replication in multiple strains of herpesviruses, in some cases even eliminating the infection altogether. The researchers tested three different strains of herpesviruses: Epstein-Barr virus, the cause of mononucleosis and some cancers; Herpes simplex viruses (HSV-1) and (HSV-2), which cause cold sores and genital herpes respectively; and human cytomegalovirus, which causes congenital herpes. The results indicated that CRISPR can be used to eliminate replication in all three strains of the virus, but that the technology was so far only successful in actually eradicating Epstein-Barr virus. The authors think this may be because the Epstein-Barr virus genome is located in dividing cells that are easily accessible to CRISPR. Comparatively, the HSV-1 genome targeted by CRISPR is located in closed-off, non-replicating neurons, which makes reaching the genome much more challenging.

Another possibility to eradicate the HSV-1 variant is being pursued by a team at Duke University. By figuring out how to switch all copies of the virus in the host from latency to their active stage at the same time, rather than the way the virus copies normally stagger their activity stage, leaving some dormant somewhere at all times, it is thought that immune system could kill the entire infected cell population, since they can no longer hide in the nerve cells.  This is a potentially risky approach especially for patients with widespread infections as there is the possibility of significant tissue damage from the immune response.  One class of drugs called antagomir could trigger reactivation. These are chemically engineered oligonucleotides or short segments of RNA, that can be made to mirror their target genetic material, namely herpes microRNAs. They could be engineered to attach and thus 'silence' the microRNA, thus rendering the virus incapable of keeping latent in their host. Professor Cullen believes a drug could be developed to block the microRNA whose job it is to suppress HSV-1 into latency.

Herpes has been used in research with HeLa cells to determine its ability to assist in the treatment of malignant tumors. A study conducted using suicide gene transfer by a cytotoxic approach examined a way to eradicate malignant tumors. Gene therapy is based on the cytotoxic genes that directly or indirectly kill tumor cells regardless of its gene expression. In this case the study uses the transfer of the Herpes simplex virus type I thymidine kinase (HSVtk) as the cytotoxic gene. Hela cells were used in these studies because they have very little ability to communicate through gap junctions. The Hela cells involved were grown in a monolayer culture and then infected with the HSV virus. The HSV mRNA was chosen because it is known to share characteristics with normal eukaryotic mRNA.

The HSVtk expression results in the phosphorylation of drug nucleoside analogues; in this case the drug ganciclovir, an antiviral medication used to treat and prevent cytomegaloviruses, converts it into the nucleoside analogue triphosphates. Once granciclovir is phosphorylated through HSV-tk it is then incorporating DNA strands when the cancer cells are multiplying. The nucleotide from the ganciclovir is what inhibits the DNA polymerization and the replication process. This causes the cell to die via apoptosis. 
	
Apoptosis is regulated with the help of miRNAs, which are small non-coding RNAs that negatively regulate gene expression. These miRNAs play a critical role in developing the timing, differentiation and death of cells. The miRNAs effect on apoptosis has affected cancer development by the regulation of cell proliferation, as well as cell transformation.  Avoidance of apoptosis is critical for the success of malignant tumors, and one way for miRNAs to possibly influence cancer development is to regulate apoptosis. In order to support this claim, Hela cells were used for the experiment discussed.

The cytotoxic drug used, ganciclovir, is capable of destroying via apoptosis transduced cells and non-transduced cells from the cellular gap junction. This technique is known as the "bystander effect," which has suggested to scientists that the effect of some therapeutic agents may be enhanced by diffusion through gap junctional intercellular communication (GJIC) or cell coupling. GJIC is an important function in the maintaining of tissue homeostasis and it is a critical factor in balance of cells dying and surviving.

When Hela cells were transfected with the HSV-tk gene, and were then put in a culture with nontransfected cells, only the HSV-tk transfected Hela cells were killed by the granciclovir, leaving the nonviral cells unharmed.   The Hela cells were transfected with the encoding for the gap junction protein connexin 43 (Cx43) to provide a channel that permits ions and other molecules to move between neighboring cells. Both Hela cells with the HSV-tk and without the HSV-tk were destroyed. This result has led to the evidence needed to state that the bystander effect in the HSV-tk gene therapy is possibly due to the Cx-mediated GJIC.

Other research

Amino acids (Arginine, Lysine) - Cold sores 
Research from 1964 into amino acid requirements of herpes simplex virus in human cells indicated that "...the lack of arginine or histidine, and possibly the presence of lysine, would interfere markedly with virus synthesis", but concludes that "no ready explanation is available for any of these observations".

Further medical evidence indicates that "absorbing more arginine may indirectly cause cold sores by disrupting the body's balance of arginine and another amino acid called lysine."

Further reviews conclude that "lysine's efficacy for herpes labialis may lie more in prevention than treatment." and that "the use of lysine for decreasing the severity or duration of outbreaks" is not supported, while further research is needed.

Essential oils 
HSV is found to be susceptible to many essential oils and their constituents, however there is concern with the cutaneous use of essential oils is the degree of skin and mucous membrane irritation.

Further reading 

 Diefenbach, R. J., & Fraefel, C. (Eds.). (2019). Herpes simplex virus: Methods and protocols (2nd ed.). New York, NY: Humana Press.
 Merten, O.-W., & Al-Rubeai, M. (Eds.). (2016). Viral vectors for gene therapy: Methods and protocols. New York, NY: Humana Press.
 Mindel, A. (2011). Herpes Simplex Virus. London, England: Springer.
 Brown, P. (1997). Herpes Simplex Virus Protocols (1998th ed.; S. M. Brown & A. R. MacLean, Eds.). New York, NY: Humana Press.
 Studahl, M., Cinque, P., & Bergstrom, T. (Eds.). (2005). Herpes Simplex Viruses. Boca Raton, FL: CRC Press.

References 

Herpes
Medical research